National Shooting Center  (CNTS) is a shooting range in Châteauroux, France. The construction work started 31 March 2016 The 2017 IPSC Handgun World Shoot in August 2017 was the first major event to be held on the range. In 2018 the final parts of the shooting range was completed.

See also 
 French Shooting Federation

References

External links 
 Official website

Shooting ranges in France